This is a list of the 22 members of the European Parliament for Sweden in the 1999 to 2004 session.

List

Notes

Sweden
List
1999